Hidalgo is one of the 39 municipalities of Durango, in north-western Mexico. The municipal seat lies at Villa Hidalgo. The municipality covers an area of 5020.8 km².

As of 2010, the municipality had a total population of 4,265. 

The municipality had 115 localities, none of which had a population over 1,000.

References

Municipalities of Durango